The Paducah Little Colonels were a minor league baseball team from Paducah, Kentucky, that played in the Class C Central League in 1897.

Team history 
On February 7, 1897, the Paducah Little Colonels were formed as a charter member of the Class C Central League. Joining the Little Colonels in the six-team league were the Cairo Egyptians, Evansville Brewers, Nashville Centennials, Terre Haute Hottentots, and Washington Browns. Paducah's uniforms were old gold and maroon.

Severe financial problems throughout the circuit forced the league to disband on July 20. As of July 19, the final day of play, the Little Colonels were in fifth place with a 31–37 (.456) record.

References 

Defunct Central League (1897) teams
Baseball teams established in 1897
Sports clubs disestablished in 1897
Defunct baseball teams in Kentucky
1897 establishments in Kentucky
1897 disestablishments in Kentucky
Paducah, Kentucky
Baseball teams disestablished in 1897